Sujaul Senior Fazil Madrasha is a private madrasa in the village of Sujaul in Barlekha Upazila, which is located in Bangladesh's Moulvibazar District. It is currently led by Headmaster Muhammad Faizur Rahman with the assistant professor being Muhammad Muinuddin Siraji.

Location and premises
The madrasa is in close proximity to Office Bazar. The madrasa has four buildings in total; one of which is 4 floors.

History
It was established on 1 January 1890. Since 1922, the students of this madrasa have been getting scholarships at different levels. In 1930, it became the first madrasa to achieve Dakhil (secondary) status in the Mohammedan Education's Assam Board. It achieved Alim status in 1965 and Fazil (degree) status in 1967. Abdul Aziz, the vice principal, left the school in 2016.

Facilities
It has an active alumni association known as the Ex-Student Council. Courses are offered in a range of subjects such as Qur'an, hadith, Arabic, Arabic grammar, sarf, fiqh, Islamic history, mathematics, agriculture, biology, chemistry, tafsir, communication and English.

References

Madrasas in Bangladesh
Barlekha Upazila
Schools in Moulvibazar District
Educational institutions established in 1890
1890 establishments in India
Alia madrasas of Bangladesh